Goli Bolagh-e Olya (also Romanized as Golī Bolāgh-e ‘Olyā; also known as Golī Bolāgh-e Bālā and Golī Bolāq-e ‘Olyā) is a village in Anjirlu Rural District, in the Central District of Bileh Savar County, Ardabil Province, Iran. At the 2006 census, its population was 62, in 15 families.

References 

Towns and villages in Bileh Savar County